Cooking For Pump-Kin Phase 1 is a compilation album by Euro House DJ/producer Benny Benassi. In 2005, it was released for the launch of his new label.

Track listing
Zdar - "Don't You Want" (Tiga Remix) – 4:56
Digitalism - "Zdarlight" (Voyage Mix) – 4:46
Silvercity - "Galactic Ride" (2020 Soundsystem Re-Edit) – 5:26
Les Visiteurs featuring Tommie Sunshine - "Time Slide By" – 5:07
Moonbootica - "Listen" (Chab Remix) – 4:38
Scanty 88 - "Flashback" – 5:16
Looseheadz - "No Fun" – 4:48
Thomas Andersson - "Washing Up" – 4:30
Sikk - "My Washing Machine" – 5:00
Mathias Schaffhauser - "Coincidance" – 5:31
Francesco Farfa - "Acidazzo" – 5:00
Bellone - "Magnetic" – 4:27
Mario Plu - "I Don't Want To Come Back" – 4:48
Cajuan - "Dance/Not Dance" – 4:46

External links
 

DJ mix albums
Benny Benassi albums
2005 compilation albums